Pouitella  is an extinct genus of terrestrial ophidian known from the Cenomanian of Brézé and Lussant, France and was first described by J-C. Rage in 1988. Only the type species, P. pervetus is known and the holotype (Univ. Paris-VI, no. BRZ 1) consists only of middle trunk vertebrae. 

Pouitella was probably the sister taxon of the slightly older Lapparentophis from the ?Albian-Cenomanian of Algeria, Morocco and Sudan. Pouitella was initially believed to have been a snake, but later studies have found it to fall under Ophidia, the clade which Serpentes also belongs to.

References 

Prehistoric snakes
Fossil taxa described in 1988